Brett Davern  is an American actor known for his role as Jake Rosati on the MTV series Awkward.

Early life
Davern was born and raised in Edmonds, Washington. His love of theater and acting started at Madrona Elementary School in Edmonds. He then attended Edmonds-Woodway High School. During his Sophomore through Senior summers he would travel to Stagedoor Manor Theatrical Training Center in upstate New York. After graduating high school in 2001  Davern enrolled at the American Musical and Dramatic Academy in New York City.

Career
While living and auditioning in New York City, Davern landed the lead role in his first film as William in Beautiful Ohio, starring alongside William Hurt, Rita Wilson, and Julianna Margulies. He has guest starred on CSI: Miami, Medium, NCIS, In Plain Sight and Cold Case, among other shows.

Since 2011, he played Jake Rosati on Awkward.. The series has been praised as the voice of this generation and won a People's Choice Award for favorite cable comedy in 2013.

Davern has appeared in the films The Pool Boys, Born to Race: Fast Track, Love & Mercy and The Stanford Prison Experiment.

Personal life
In his free time, Davern displays a passion for racing cars. In 2013 he competed in the Toyota Pro/Celebrity Race at the Grand Prix of Long Beach. The race raises funds for Racing for Kids, an organization helping multiple children's hospitals in southern California. After qualifying in 5th position he managed to finish the race in 2nd place. In 2014 he competed again and won after qualifying on the pole with the fastest time.

In addition to his charity work with Racing for Kids, Davern helps Wounded Warrior Project, Boys & Girls Clubs of America, Stars for Smiles, and Ronald McDonald House.

He has revealed on podcasts that he is married with two children: a son and a daughter, the latter born in 2017.

Filmography

Film

Television

References

External links
 
  Brett Davern Profile on MTV

Year of birth missing (living people)
21st-century American male actors
American male film actors
American male television actors
American podcasters
Living people
Male actors from Washington (state)
People from Edmonds, Washington